The 1964 CONCACAF Youth Tournament was held in Guatemala.

Teams
The following teams entered the tournament:

First round

Group 1

Group 2

Final round

External links
Results by RSSSF

CONCACAF Under-20 Championship
1964 in youth association football
International association football competitions hosted by Guatemala
Concacaf
April 1964 sports events in North America